Dr. Seshulatha Kosuru is a leading Carnatic musician and teacher from Andhra Pradesh. She has performed widely in India and abroad and has received numerous awards and titles from many leading organizations. She has tuned and released many carnatic & devotional albums and has also set to tune many dance ballets.

Background

She holds a Ph.D. in music from Potti Sriramulu Telugu University, Hyderabad, for her thesis The Rare Janya Ragas having Single Composition of Musical Trinity with Special Reference to Tyagaraja.
She holds an MA in music from Padmavathi Mahila University, Tirupathi, an MA in Telugu literature from Osmania University and BA in music from Andhra University.

She had her initial training under her mother and Sri Chodavarapu Subba Rao, Sri Desapathi Raju, Sri Sistu Prabhakara Krishna Murthy Sastry and received further training at Kalapeetham, Tirupati during 1980-81 under the guidance of Sri Balantrapu Rajanikantha Rao, Sri A. Narayana Iyer, Sri K.R.Ganapathi and V.L.Janaki Ram. She received advanced training from Late Sri Voleti Venkateswarulu during 1981–88 with scholarship from Sangeet Academy of Andhra Pradesh Govt, and also received advanced training from Sangita Kalanidhi Sri Nedunuri Krishnamurthy.

Professional experience
 Seshulatha Kosuru has been giving numerous performances both in India and abroad
 She is a member of faculty, Department of Music, Telugu University since 1989
 She is a graded AIR, Hyderabad artist in both classical and light music styles
 She has given performances in classical & devotional music on AIR, Doordhrshan & other television channels
 Judge on several music shows on television & other music associations
 She has set music to a number of lyrics and compositions and also several dance ballets (Sarwam sayi mayam, sambhavaami yuge yuge, Goda devi etc.,) & musical operas.
 Conducts various lecture demonstrations, private classes at home and also online
 She is currently a teacher and Academy Registrar at SIFAS (Singapore Indian Fine Arts Society).

Awards
Dwaram Venkataswami Naidu and Smt. Ivaturi Bala Swaraswati Devi Memorial Cash prizes for standing first in BA Music in 1984
Recipient of ‘Outstanding Young Talented Person Award’ at the District and State level from Jaycees Club in 1987
Recipient of Smt. Rukmini Jagannathan Puraskar for standing First in Sangeet Alankar from Akhil Bharateeya Gandharve Vidyalaya Mandal Maharashtra, 1998

References

External links

Sri Vighneswara Suprabhatam
Omkara nadamayam
Dance ballets

Singers from Andhra Pradesh
Living people
Year of birth missing (living people)
Indian women classical singers
Women Carnatic singers
Carnatic singers
Indian music educators
Women educators from Andhra Pradesh
20th-century Indian educators
21st-century Indian singers
20th-century Indian singers
21st-century Indian educators
Women musicians from Karnataka
Educators from Andhra Pradesh
20th-century Indian women singers
21st-century Indian women singers
Women music educators
20th-century women educators
21st-century women educators